The  India Service Medal 1939–1945 was a campaign medal of the Commonwealth. It was awarded to Indian Forces for three years of non-operational service in India during the Second World War.

Eligibility 
The medal was instituted on 6 June 1946.

It was awarded to Indian Forces, including Reserve, State and Women's forces, for at least three years of non-operational service in India between 3 September 1939 and 2 September 1945. It was issued in addition to, and worn immediately after, British campaign World War II medals, although those eligible for the Defence Medal could not receive the India Service Medal as well.

Approximately 220,000 medals were issued.

Description 
 It is a circular, cupro-nickel medal, 36mm diameter.
 The obverse has the crowned effigy of King George VI facing left, with the legend "GEORGIVS VI D:G:BR:OMN:REX ET INDIAE IMP." (George VI by the grace of God King of Great Britain and Emperor of India). 
 The reverse shows a relief map of India and the words "INDIA" above and "1939–45" below. 
 The medal was awarded unnamed. 
 The ribbon represented the colours of the Order of the Star of India and the Order of the Indian Empire.

Clasps 
There are no clasps for this medal.

References

External links 
 India's World War II Medals

Military awards and decorations of India